Skt Josef's, Roskilde International School (Danish: Sankt Josefs Skole) is an independent, Roman Catholic school in Roskilde, Denmark. The school has both an International and Danish department with a total of more than 1000 pupils.

History

A group of Daughters of Wisdom nuns settled in Roskilde in 1901. They came to Denmark as a result of the separation of the church from the state in France. The established Skt Josef's School as well as the adjacent St Mary's Hospital in 1904. 

They were also involved in the establishment of St Lawrence's Church on the opposite side of the street.

The school was initially a girls' school and all teaching was conducted by nuns. Later they began to use trained teachers and boys were accepted as pupils from 1924.

In 2012, the International Department opened with its first thirteen students.

Today
The school has both an international and Danish department with a total of more than 1000 pupils. The Danish department covers reception class to 10th grades of the Danish school curriculum. The International department covers Year 1 to Year 11 (age 5 to 16) and is based on the Cambridge International Education programme.

References

External links
 Official website

Catholic schools in Denmark
Education in Roskilde
1904 establishments in Denmark